Sistla Janaki (born 23 April 1938) is an Indian playback singer and occasional music composer from Andhra Pradesh. She is referred to respectfully as "Janaki Amma" and Nightingale of South India. She is one of the best-known playback singers in India. She is referred to as 'Gaana Kogile' (Singing Cuckoo) in Karnataka and 'Isaikkuyil' in Tamil Nadu She has recorded over 48,000 songs in films, albums, TV and Radio which includes solos, duets, chorus and title tracks in 17 languages including Kannada, Malayalam, 
Telugu, Tamil, Hindi, Sanskrit, Odia, Tulu, Urdu, Punjabi, Badaga, Bengali, Konkani and also in foreign languages such as English, Japanese, German, and Sinhala. However the highest number of songs in her career were in Kannada followed by Malayalam.<ref name="youtube.com"/ Starting in 1957 with the Tamil film Vidhiyin Vilayattu, her career has spanned over six decades.

She has won four National Film Awards and 33 different State Film Awards. She is the recipient of an honorary doctorate from the University of Mysore, the Kalaimamani award from Government of Tamil Nadu and Karnataka Rajyotsava award from Government of Karnataka In 2013, she refused to accept Padma Bhushan, and pointed that it is too little and had come "too late" and that South Indian artists were not given their due recognition.

Widely acclaimed as one of the most versatile singers, her association with singer S. P. Balasubrahmanyam and composer Ilaiyaraaja is most talked about. In the 1960s, 1970s and 1980s her duets with P. B. Srinivas, S. P. Balasubrahmanyam, K. J. Yesudas, P. Jayachandran and Dr. Rajkumar topped the charts across all the South Indian languages. She has sung in almost all the genres of songs and has performed live on stages in more than 5000 concerts across the globe. She is the only singer to have sung 100 songs in four South Indian languages (Telugu, Tamil, Kannada and Malayalam) in the very first year of her career. In October 2016, Janaki announced her retirement from singing for films and stage appearances. However, under pressure from the film fraternity, she made a comeback for the Tamil film Pannadi in 2018.

Early life and family 
Janaki was born on 23 April in Pallapatla, Repalle Taluka, in Guntur, Madras Presidency, British India (now in Andhra Pradesh). Her father, Sreeramamurthy Sistla was an Ayurvedic doctor and teacher. She spent most of her childhood in Sircilla where she got her first on stage performance opportunity at the age of nine. She learnt the basics of music through a Nadaswaram vidwan Paidiswamy. However she never pursued any formal training in the classical music.

Janaki married V. Ramprasad in 1959. He encouraged her career and accompanied her during most of her recordings. He died in 1997 due to cardiac arrest. Their only son Murali Krishna resides in Hyderabad and
his wife Uma Muralikrishna is a Bharatanatyam and Kuchipudi dancer.

Janaki can fluently converse and write in 5 Indian languages – Telugu, Tamil, Kannada, Malayalam and Hindi.

Career 

While in her twenties, Janaki moved to Chennai on the advice of her uncle, to work with Music composer R. Sudarsanam in AVM Studios as a singer. She started her career as a playback singer in the Tamil movie Vidhiyin Vilayattu in 1957. Subsequently, she performed in the Telugu film M.L.A.. She sang film songs in 6 languages in her very first year.
She picked a Malayalam lullaby "Amma Poovinum" from 10 Kalpanakal as her swansong of her 60-year singing career and retired on 28 October 2017 with a concert held at Mysuru .

Kannada films 
S Janaki's highest number of songs are in Kannada. Her solos and duets, with P B Srinivas, S. P. Balasubrahmanyam and Dr. Rajkumar are considered evergreen.

Janaki sang her first Kannada song in 1957. By the early 60s, she had started working with many prominent music composers. Throughout the 1970s and 80s she remained the number one female playback singer in Kannada films. Most of the music directors, from G. K. Venkatesh, Rajan–Nagendra to Hamsalekha, gave her most of their top compositions.

She has a record number of duets with P B Srinivas, S P Balasubrahmanyam and Dr Rajkumar. She was awarded the Karnataka Rajyotsava awarded in 2014. She was awarded an honorary doctorate from the University of Mysore for her contributions to Kannada film and music.

Some of her top hit solos in Kannada cinema are:
 "Shiva shiva ennada naaligeyeke" Hemavathi (film) (1977)
 "Poojisalende Hoogala" Eradu Kanasu (1974)
 "Gaganavu Ello" Gejje Pooje (1969)
 "Omme Ninnanu" Gaali Maathu (1981)
 "Gaaligopura Ninnashatheera" Nanda Deepa (1963)
 "Nambide Ninna" Sandhya Raga (1966)
 "Barede Neenu" Seetha (1970 film)
 "Banallu Neene" Bayalu Daari (1976)
 "Karedaru Kelade" Sanaadi Appanna (1977)
 "Deepavu Ninnade" Mysore Mallige (film) (1992)
 "Bharatha Bhooshira" Upasane (1974)
 "Sukhada Swapna Gaana" Mareyada Haadu (1981)
 "Thangaliyalli Naanu" Janma Janmada Anubandha (1980)
 "Akasha Deepavu Neenu" Pavana Ganga (1977)
 "Aaseya Bhava Olavina Jeeva" Mangalya Bhagya (1976)
 "Devara Aata" Avala Hejje (1981)
 "Hoovinda Hoovige" Hombisilu (1978)
 "Nagu Endhidhe" Pallavi Anu Pallavi (1983)
 "Panchama Veda" Gejje Pooje (1969)
 "Kareye Kogile" Navajeevana (1964)
 "Yava Janmadha Maithri" Gowri (1963 film)
 "Pogadirelo Ranga" Haalu Jenu (1982)
 "Naa Mechchidha" Naa Mechida Huduga (1972)
 "Hele Gelathi" Kesarina Kamala (1973)
 "Thanu Ninnadu" Ibbani Karagithu (1983)
 "Maguve Ninna Hoonage" Gejje Pooje (1969)
 "Nee Yaro Enosaka" Hasiru Thorana (1970)
 "Nodu Baa Nodu Baa" Miss Leelavathi (1965)
 "Baagila Theredhiruve" Premanubandha  (1981)
 "Bhuvaneshwariya Nene" Mareyada Haadu (1981)
 "Indu Enage Govinda" Eradu Kanasu (1974)
 "Kamalada Mogadole" Hosa Ithihaasa  (1984)
 "Mahalaksmi Manege" Lakshmi Kataksha  (1985)
 "Oh Panduranga" Sathi Sakkubai  (1985)
 "Hagalo Irulo" Mayura (film) (1975)
 "Aadona Baa Baa Gopala" Malli Maduve (1963)
 "Kandu Kandu Nee" Bhale Adrushtavo Adrushta (1971)
 "Aacharavilladha Nalige" Upasane (1974)
 "Hoovondu Beku Ballige" Pavana Ganga (1977)
 "Ragavendra- Bidenu Ninna Pada"  Naa Ninna Bidalare (1979)
 "Kangalu Thumbiralu" Chandanada Gombe (1979)
 "Olavina Gelayane" Naniruvude Ninagagi (1979)
 "Manase Nagaleke" Namma Makkalu (1969)
 "Nagisalu Neenu" Gaali Maathu (1981)

Malayalam films 
S Janaki and Malayalam songs are inseparable, she sang her first Malayalam song back in 1957. She practiced the correct accent and the nuances of the language which later made her one of the most sought after singers in the industry. She was the favorite of many popular music composers like V Dakshinamoorthi, MS Baburaj, Shyam, MB Sreenivasan, A.T.Ummer, and Salil Choudhary.

S Janaki went on to sing thousands of songs from early 1960s to mid 80s. She received her first Kerala state film award for best singer in 1970 and went on to win the same almost every year for the next 15 years. It was her command over the language and perfect diction that took her to great heights in Malayalam films. S Janaki is perhaps the only non-Malayali artist who has won maximum awards in Malayalam films.

Some of her hit solo tracks in Malayalam films are:
 "Thaliritta Kinaakkal" Moodupadam (1963)
 "Sooryakaanthi" Kattuthulasi (1965)
 "Aa Nimishathinte" Chandrakantham (1974)
 "Unni Arariro" Avalude Ravukal (1978)
 "Mazhavil Kodi Kavadi" Swapnam (1973)
 "Unaroo Vegam Nee" Moodalmanju (1970)
 "Vasantha Panchami Naalil" Bhargavi Nilayam (1964)
 "Sandhye Kanneerithende" Madanolsavam (1978)
 "Malarkodi Pole" Vishukanni (1977)
 "Mizhiyoram" Manjil Virinja Pookkal (1980)
 "Mouname Nirayum" Thakara (1980)
 "Naadha Neevarum Kaalocha" Chamaram (1980)
 "Thenum Vayambum" Thenum Vayambum (1981)
 "Thumbi Vaa Thumbakudathin" Olangal (1982)
 "Swarna Mukile" Ithu Njangalude Katha (1982)
 "Moham Kondu Njan" Shesham Kazhchayil (1985)
 "Konchi Karayalle" Poomukhappadiyil Ninneyum Kaathu (1986)
 "Olathumbathirunnu" Pappayude Swantham Appoos (1992)
 "Kaikkudanna Niraye" Mayamayooram (1993)
 "Sarapoli Mala" 19 April (1996)
 "Amma Poovinum" 10 Kalpanakal (2016)

Tamil films 
S Janaki sang her first Tamil song in 1957. The song Singaravelane Deva from the movie Konjum Salangai brought her to limelight in Tamil films. M. S. Viswanathan gave her many hit songs every year throughout 60s and early 70s. It was the song Unnidathil ennaik kodutthen Avalukendru Or Manam (1971) that consolidated her position as the most promising singer thereafter.

She sang many songs under many famous composers. Ilaiyaraaja – S. P. Balasubrahmanyam- S Janaki combination gave hit after hit from mid 1970s till 1990s. S Janaki is the only singer who has won state awards under the oft-called top three music composers of the state (M. S. Viswanathan, Ilaiyaraaja and A. R. Rahman).

Some of her best solos in Tamil cinema are:
 "Singara Velane deva" Konjum Salangai (1962)
 "Indha Mandrathil Odi Varum" Policekaran Magal (1962)
 "Kannan Mananilayai" Deivathin Deivam (1962)
 "Azhagiya Megangal" Ganga Gowri(1973)
 Annakkili (1976)
 "Annakkili Unnai"
 "Machana Parthingala"
 "Sudhachamba Patcharisi"
 "Sendhoora Poove" 16 Vayathinile (1977)
 "Kuyile Kavikkuyile" Kavikkuyil (1977)
 "Azhagiya Kanne" Uthiripookkal (1979)
 "Kaatril Endhan" Johnny (1980)
 "Dhoorathil Naan Kanda Un Mugam" Nizhalgal (1980)
 Ullasa Paravaigal (1980)
 "Azhagu Aayiram"
 "Naan Undan Thaayaaga"
 "Idhu Oru Nila Kaalam" Tik Tik Tik (1981)
 "Putham Pudhu Kaalai" Alaigal Oivathillai (1981)
 "Sangeethame" Koyil Puraa (1981)
 "Ponmeni Urugudhe" Moondram Pirai (1982)
 "Naatham En Jeevanae" Kaadhal Oviyam (1982)
 "Ponvaanam Panneer Thoovuthu" Indru Nee Nalai Naan(1983)
 "Azhagu Malaraada" Vaidhegi Kaathirunthaal (1984)
 "Pillai Nila" Neengal Kettavai (1984)
 "Poove Pani Poove" Nilavu Suduvathillai (1984)
 Naan Paadum Paadal(1984)
 "Paadavaa Un Paadalai"
 "Devan Kovil "
 "Andha Indhiralogamey" Ponnu Pudichirukku (1984)
 Mouna Ragam (1986)
 "Chinna Chinna Vannakuyil"
 "Oho Megam Vanthatho"
 "Raasave Unna Nambi" Muthal Mariyathai (1985)
 "Vaidhegi Raman" Pagal Nilavu (1985)
 "Ooru Sanam" Mella Thirandhathu Kadhavu (1986)
 "Kannan Manam yenna" Vasantha Raagam (1986)
 "Panneeril Nanaintha" Uyire Unakkaga (1986)
 "Manthira Punnagaiyo" Mandhira Punnagai (1986)
 "Kannan Vanthu" Rettai Vaal Kuruvi (1987)
 "Neeradi Vaa Thenrale" Mangai Oru Gangai (1987)
 "Radha Azhaikkiral" Therkathi Kallan (1987)
 Agni Natchathiram
 "Oru Poonga Vanam"
 "Roja Poo Adivanthathu"
 "Iravu Nilavu" Anjali(1990)
 "Thalattum Poongkaatru" Gopura Vasalile (1991)
 "Udhayam Neeye" Ennarukil Nee Irunthal (1991)
 "Chinna Thayaval" Thalapathi (1991)
 "Athi Kaalai Kaatre Nillu" Thalaivasal (1992)
 "Thoodhu Selvadharadi" Singaravelan (1992)
 "Ezhelu Jenma Bandham" Therku Theru Machan (1992)
 "Anthi Vanathile Oru" Annai Vayal (1992)
 "Aasai Athigam Vechu" Marupadiyum(1993)
 "Anbe Vaa Arugile" Kilipetchu Ketkava(1993)
 Aranmanai Kili(1993)
 "Raasave Unnai Vida"
 "Vanmathiye"
 "Ninaikkatha Neramillai" Thangakkili(1993)
 "Alli Alli Veesuthama" Atha Maga Rathiname(1994)
 "Oru Santhana Kaattu" Ellame En Rasathan(1995)
 "Sollaayo Vaaithiranthu" Mogamul(1995)
 "Nenjinile Nenjinile" Uyire(1998)
 "Margazhi Thingal Allava" Sangamam (1999)

Telugu films 
S Janaki started her career in Telugu films in 1957 in a Movie MLA. Movies like Bava maradalu, Pooja Phalam and Bangaru Panjaram had songs by S Janaki which were immensely popular. She gave continuous hits throughout 1960s and 70s. She continued to give hits till mid 90s. S Janaki has won 12 Nandi awards, 10 for films and 2 for television serial songs.A few of her solos are:

 "Nee Aasa Adiyaasa" and "Idenandi Idenandi Bhagyanagaramu" M.L.A.(1957 film)
 "Podamu Ravoi Bava" Kutumba Gowravam (1957)
 "Anukunadanta" Anna Thammudu (1958)
 "Gaajulamma Gaajulu" Karthavarayuni Katha (1958)
 "Le Le Le" Sobha (1958)
 "Yentho Yentho Vinthale" Bala Nagamma (1959)
 "Mallipoola Rangayya" Banda Ramudu (1959)
 "Andaala O Chandamama" "Ninu Variyinchi" Daiva Balam (1959)
 "Neeve Ninoy" "Aadu Pilla" Rechukka Pagatichukka (1959)
 "Ayyalu Ammalu.... Suno Chinnababu" Vachina Kodalu Nachindi (1959)
 "Dabbarasam bale nara dabbarasam" Anna Chellelu (1960)
 "Go Go Go Gongura", "Entha Madhura", "Kalaganti Namma", "Jagamantha" adn  "Bhaliraa"  Devanthakudu (1960)
 "Theeyani Patalu" Kadeddulu Ekaram Nela (1960)
 "O Daarinapoye Chinnavada" Maa Babu (1960)
 "Akkayyaku Seemantham" Pelli Kanuka (1960)
 "Nindu Punnami Eela" Runanubandham (1960)
 "Andhamaina Baava" Runanubandham (1960)
 "Giliginthalu" Sri Venkateswara Mahatyam (1960)
 "Kanara Raja" Indrajeet (Sati Sulochana) (1961)
 "Jaya Jaya Meghanatha" Indrajeet (Sati Sulochana) (1961)
 "Idereeyi Kaadoyi" Pendli Pilupu (1961)
 "Niganigalaade Chirunavvu" Pendli Pilupu (1961)
 "Adurika Ledae" Sabhash Raja (1961)
 "Kalalalo Kavitha Latha" Santha (1961)
 "O Paluvannela Pavurama" Santha (1961)
 "Yemiti Kavalo" Taxi Ramudu (1961)
 "Mamaiah Tirunaalaku" Taxi Ramudu (1961)
 "Maa Kittayya Puttinadinam" Vagdanam (1961)
 "Tappatlo Talalo" Vagdanam (1961)
 "Neeli Meghalalo" Bava Maradallu (1961)
 "Adadani Orachupulo" Aradhana (1962)
 "Englishlona Marriage" Aradhana (1962)
 "Adagali Adagali Adigedevaro Telali" Chitti Tammudu (1962)
 "Idhi Chakkani Lokam" Dakshayagnam (1962)
 "O Raayudo" Gali Medalu (1962)
 "Unnadhi Chepputha Vintara" Gulebakavali Katha (1962)
 "Kaaligajje Kadalakamunde" Gulebakavali Katha (1962)
 "Salamalekum Sahebugaru" Gulebakavali Katha (1962)
 "Kalala Alalapai Telenu Manasu Malle Poovai" Gulebakavali Katha (1962)
 "Ee Nijam Telusuko" Khaidi Kannayya (1962)
 "Oho Oho Paavurama" Manchi Manasulu (1962)
 "Aakashamele Andala Raje" Rakta Sambandham (1962)
 "Ee Pagalu" Siri Sampadalu (1962)
 "Venugaanammu Vinipinchene" Siri Sampadalu (1962)
 "Puvvu Navvenu" Siri Sampadalu (1962)
 "Varaniki Okkate Sunday" Siri Sampadalu (1962)
 "Maimarapinche Ee Sogaru" Swarna Manjari (1962)
 "Aadaenu Paadaenuga" Swarna Manjari (1962)
 "Chootham Rare" Swarna Manjari (1962)
 "Yemo Yemo Yedhalona" Swarna Manjari (1962)
 "Nava Bhavanalu" Tiger Ramudu (1962)
 "Varudhuni Pravarakyudu" Tiger Ramudu (1962)
 "Ulakaka Palakaka" Tiger Ramudu (1962)
 "Kallallo Neerendhulaku Kalakaalam Vilapinchutaku" Constable Koothuru (1963)
 "Jigi Jigelumani" Irugu Porugu (1963)
 "Nrutya Rupakam" Irugu Porugu (1963)
 "Sannajaji Chelimi Kori" Irugu Porugu (1963)
 "Virise Challani Vennela Marala Eenadu Maa Kannula" Lava Kusa (1963)
 "Jal Jal Jal" Manchi Chedu (1963)
 "Jeevana Raagam" and "Kannula Vindav Andaalu" Pempudu Koothuru (1963)
 "Zara Tahro" Savati Koduku (1963)
 "Mudamu Kanedepudo" and "Kanthude Pranamaguchu" Valmiki (1963)
 "Naravara O Kuruvara" Nartanasala (1963)
 "Sevalu Cheyyale" Bobbili Yuddham (1964)
 "Sagamapa Gari", "Yichate Pondavoyi" and "Chikkevule Dora" Desa Drohulu (1964)
 "Ontiga Samayam Chikkindhi" Doctor Chakravarthy (1964)
 "Manchi Manasu" Kalavari Kodalu (1964)
 "Ponnakayavanti Police" Manchi Manishi (1964)
 "Mogunaa Ee Veena" Murali Krishna (1964)
 "Pagale Vennela", "Madhana Manasayera" and "Siva Dheeksha" Pooja Phalam (1964)
 "Are Kushi Kushi", "Bhalare Dheeruda" and "Naaku Neeve Kaavalera" Devata (1965)
 "Mavayya Chikkavayya", "Naa Kanti Velugu" and "Evare Naa Cheli" Dorikithe Dongalu (1965)
 "Nee Kanu Doyini" Gudi Gantalu (1965)
 "Dheedikku" Mangamma Sapatham (1965)
 "Nee Kaliki" and "Okaru Kavali" Manushulu Mamathalu (1965)
 "Oh Vannekaada" Pandava Vanavasam (1965)
 "O Deva Varaaha Mukha Nrusimha Sikha" + 4 songs Sri Simhachala Kshetra Mahima (1965)
 "Yevevo Chilipi Talapulu" Sumangali (1965)
 "Valapuloni" Thodu Needa (1965)
 "Kalla Kapatam" Veerabhimanyu (1965)
 "O Cinnoda" and "Emantunnadi Ni Hrudayam" Visala Hrudayalu (1965)
 "Nene Nene Letha" Zamindar (1966)
 "Cheli Yemaaye" Aggi Barata (1966)
 "Andala Chinadanini" and "Bhale Bhale Posukolu Bavaiah" Mangalasutram (1966)
 "Teeyani Tolireyi" and "Oka Megham" Palnati Yuddham (1966)
 "Idhigo Vacchithi Rathi Raajaa" and "Enaleni Aanandam" Paramanandayya Sishyula Katha (1966)
 "Andamannadi Neelo Chudali" and "Idhigo Idhigo Tamasha" Potti Pleader (1966)
 "Nadireyi Eee jamulo" and "Vennela Reyi Chandamama" Rangula Ratnam (1966)
 "Silakave" and "Rasakreeda Ika" Sangeeta Lakshmi (1966)
 "Karuninchave Tulasi Maata" Sri Krishna Tulabharam (1966)
 "Kusalama Echanuntivo", "Ne Raanantina Oo Mavaiah", "Ohiri Saahiri", "Kusalamaa Kusalamaa", "Vallabhaa Priya Vallabha" and "Vasanta Gaaliki Valapulu Rega" Srikakula Andhra Mahavishnuvu Katha (1966)
 "Janani Varadayini Trilochani", "Sirisiri Lali Chinnari Lali", "Jayaho Jayaho" and "Kanulaku Veluguvu Neeve" Bhakta Prahlada (1967)
 "Uyyalo Uyyalo" and "Entha Bagunadhi" Gopaludu Bhoopaludu (1967)
 "Siggenduke Cheli" and "Sarileru Neekevvaru" Kanchu Kota (1967)
 "Ekkada Untavo" and "Manasunte Chaladule" Private Master (1967)
 "Swagatamayya" and "Hayee Veredhi" Sati Sumathi (1967)
 "Edevela Naa Valapu", "Digara Digara" and "O Sundari Kondalanni Vedikenu" Vasantha Sena (1967)
 "Hello Mr.Govula Gopanna" and "Hadapettakoi Bava" Govula Gopanna (1968)
 "Ille Kovela Challani Valape Devatha" Lakshmi Nivasam (1968)
 "Preminchuta Pillala Vantu" and "Thulli Thulli Padutondi" Manchi Kutumbam (1968)
 "Nene Unnanu Nee Kosam" Nenante Nene (1968)
 "Yelamarachinaavo" Uma Chandi Gowri Sankarula Katha (1968)
 "Thappantaavaa", "Emo Emo Idhi", "Kannu Kannu Chaera", "Laddu Laddu" and "Evaranukunnaave" Aggi Pidugu (1969)
 "Kaipekkinche Kammani Reyi" Ardharathiri (1969)
 "Nee Padamule Chaalu Raama Nee Pada Dhoolule Padivelu", "Pagalaite Doravera Raatiri Naa Raajuvula" and 3 more Bangaru Panjaram (1969)
 "Pagalaite Doravera" Bangaru Panjaram (1970)
 "Niddurapora Saami" and "Antha Thelisi Vachchane" Kodalu Diddina Kapuram (1970)
 "Sukravarapu Poddu Sirini", "Kilakila Bullammo" + 3 more  Lakshmi Kataksham (1970)
 "Em Chestavoy Bullemma" Marina Manishi (1970)
 "Idigo Idigo" and "Annagarina Brathukulo" Maro Prapancham (1970)
 "Nuvvu Navvu Thunnavu" Thalla ? Pellama ? (1970)
 "Yelukora Veeraadhi Veera" + 2 more Vijayam Manade (1970)
 "Ee Daari Naa Swamy Nadichene... Rane Vacchadu" Chelleli Kapuram (1971)
 "Nallavaade" Dasara Bullodu (1971)
 "Po Po Entha Dooram" Manasu Mangalyam (1971)
 "Sarananna Vaarini" and "Chirunavvula" Pavitra Hrudayalu (1971)
 "Chinnari Maradaliki Pellavutundi" Ramalyam (1971)
 "Kalagantini", "Priya Priya", "Maatameeragalada", "Gopi Munijana" + 5 more Sri Krishna Satya (1971)
 "Je Jela Talliki" Sri Krishna Vijayamu (1971)
 "Gunna Mamidi Komma Meedha Goollu Rendunnayi" Bala Mitrula Katha (1972)
 "Nuvvu Nenu Ekkamainamu" and "Idenannamata" Koduku Kodalu (1972)
 "Inthe Inthe" Kula Gowravam (1972)
 "Chikkani Gopala Krishnudu" Sri Krishnanajaneya Yuddham (1972)
 "Madi Madi Suchi Suchi" Desoddharakulu (1973)
 "Pilla Shokillaa" Manchivallaku Manchivadu (1973)
 "Yemkavaloi Neeku" and "Netiki Mallee Maaintlo" Vaade Veedu (1973)
 "Paala Raathi Bommaku" and "Amma Nanna Jagadamlo" Ammayi Pelli (1974)
 "Nanna Ane Rendu" Deeksha (1974)
 "Gopala Nanu Palimparaava" and "Challni Swamy" Manushullo Devudu (1974)
 "Thaka Thaka Thaka"  Nomu (1974)
 "Sudha Neeke" Maya Maschindra (1975)
 "Ontarigaa Unnaamu" Samsaram (1975)
 "Ra Ra O Raja" Sri Ramanjaneya Yuddham (1975)
 "Chikapanta" Teerpu (1975)
 "Tell Me, Tell Me, Tell Me" America Ammayi (1976)
 "Neekaela Intha Niraasa", "Nede Thelisindhi", "Naa Madi Ninnu Pilichindi"	,"Gadasari Bulloda" and "Laila Majnu" Aradhana (1976)
 "Kallalo Unnadedo Kannulake Telusu" Anthuleni Katha (1976)
 "Idhi Maro Lokam" Bangaru Manishi (1976)
 "Siva Siva Ananelara" Bhakta Kannappa (1976)
 "Sirimalle Puvvalle Navvu, Chinnari Papalle Navvu" Jyothi (1976)
 "Diamond Rani" Neram Nadi Kadu Akalidi (1976)
 "Eesaana Nenu Needana" Vemulawada Bheemakavi (1976)
 "Yendayya Idi" Aame Katha (1977)
 "Ammathodu Abbathodu", "Ennallakennaallaku Ennellu" and "Choodara Choodara" Adavi Ramudu (1977)
 "Okata Renda Thommidi" Chanakya Chandragupta (1977)
 "Telisenule Priyaa Rasikaa" + 3 more Dana Veera Sura Karna (1977)
 "Balaraju" Edureeta (1977)
 "Anuragam" Maa Iddari Katha (1977)
 "Oh Pilla" Annadammula Savaal (1978)
 "Tholi Kodi" Athani Kante Ghanudu (1978)
 "Poonindiro Polerama"	KD No.1 (1978)
 "Padaharellaku Neelo Nalo" Maro Charitra (1978)
 "Ide Melu Kolupu" and "Ide Melu Kolupu-II" Melu Kolupu (1978)
 "Sirimallepoova", "Vayasanta Mudupugatti Vastantale Adukundaam", "Kattukathalu Nenu Cheppi Navviste" and "Pantachelo Paalakanki Navvindi" Padaharella Vayasu (1978)
 "Nomallo Mamilla Tota Kada" Pranam Khareedu (1978)
 "Sannallakochchadu" and "Dikkulenni Dhaataado" Rajaputra Rahasyam	 (1978)
 "Tholivalapu Tondaralu" and "Abbo Neredu Pallu" Sommokadidhi Sokokadidhi (1978)
 "Lathalaga Oogevollu" Sri Rama Pattabhishekam (1978)
 "Jeevitha Madhusaala" Vayasu Pilichindi (1978)
 "Yemani Cheppedi" + 2 more Andadu Aagadu (1979)
 "Andamaina Anubhavam" Andamaina Anubhavam (1979)
 "Gaalikadupu Ledu Kadalikanthu Ledu" Idi Katha Kaadu (1979)
 "Aaraneekuma Ee Deepam Karthika Deepam" and "Nee Kougililo Taladachi Nee Chetulalo Kanumoosi" Karthika Deepam (1979)
 "Ravivarmake Andani" Ravanude Ramudayithe ? (1979)
 "Nirajanam Jayanirajanam" + 2 more Sri Madvirata Parvam (1979)
 "Idhi Puvullu Pooyani" Vetagadu (1979)
 "Daa Daa Daa Daa Daa" +2 more Yugandhar (1979)
 "Ammi Olammi" Chuttalunnaru Jagratha (1980)
 "Aaakali Meedha" and "Akka Chellelu"  Circus Ramudu (1980)
 5 songs in Guru (1980)
 2 songs in Jathara (1980)
 "Naa Manasu" Kaksha (1980)
 3 songs in Kotha Jeevithalu
 "Radha Krishnayya" Moodu Mulla Bandham (1980)
 2 songs in Nayakudu Vinayakudu (1980)
 "Omkaara Naadaanusandhanamou" and "Saamajavaragamana" Sankarabharanam (1980)
 "Jyothilakshmi" Sardar Paparayudu (1980)
 "Andamaina Lokamani" and "Kudirinda Rogam" Tholi Kodi koosindi (1980)
 "Nemaliki Nerpina" Saptapadi (1981)
 "Kanne Pillavani" and "Tu Hai Raja" Akali Rajyam (1981)
 "Sundaramo Sumaduramo" Amavasya Chandrudu (1981)
 "Chilakaluri Peta Chinnadaanni" Maha Purushudu (1981)
 "Aliveni Aanimutyama", "Neelalu Kaarenaa Kaalaalu", "Kalakanthi Kolakullo" and + 2 more songs Mudda Mandaram (1981)
 "Nada Nilayude Sivudu" + 3 more songs Parvathi Parameswarulu (1981)
 "Aata Tandana Tana" and "Maa Inti Alluda" Prema Mandiram (1981)
 "Germany Ke Andam" Prema Pichi (1981)
 "Hari Om Govinda" Prema Simhasanam (1981)
 "Govullu Tellana", "Bhamane Satyabhamane", "Marugelara O Raghava", "Nemaliki Nerpina Nadakalivi", "Om Jatavedase" (Sri Durga Suktam) and "Ye Kulamu Needante" Saptapadi (1981)
 "Manchi Tharunam" + 3 songs Satyam Sivam (1981)
 "Udayakirana Lekhalo" Srivari Muchatlu (1981)
 "Mallemogga" + 2 songs Swapna (1981)
 "Nadaka Hamsadhvani" + 1 song Bangaru Kanuka (1982)
 "Rasikudavani" Kalavari Samsaram (1982)
 "Meghama" Manchu Pallaki (1982)
 "Ragamo Anuragamo" Nalugu Stambhalata (1982)
 "Vinnapaalu Vinavale Vintavintalu", "Nee Jada Kucchulu Naa Medakucchulu", "Oho Taddhimi Takajhanu" and "Marugelaraa O Raaghavaa" Subha Lekha (1982)
 "Ikkada Ikkada" Swayamvaram (1982)
 Yama Kinkarudu (1982)
 "Banthee Chamanthi", "Navvindi Malle Chendu", "Urakalai Godavari", "Sande Poddula Kada" and "Vela Pala Ledu" Abhilasha (1983)
 "Kougili Isthe" Chattaniki Veyi Kallu (1983)
 "Chekkateppudavutundo" Kirayi Kotigadu (1983)
 "Emani Ne Cheli Paduduno", "Sala Sala Nanu Kavvinchanela", "Manasa Sirasa" and "Ammagade Bujjigade" Mantri Gari Viyyankudu (1983)
 "Kanubommala Pallakilpna Kanne Siggu Vadhuvayyindi" + 2 songs Nelavanka (1983)
 "Sambararala Sankranthi"and "O Bhama Nee Nomu" Oorantha Sankranthi (1983)
 "Chinnadani Konachoopu" and "Yavvanam Neeku Swagatham" Roshagadu (1983)
 "Jabili Vachindi" + 4 songs Simham Navvindi (1983)
 "Veyi Chukka" Siripuram Monagadu (1983)
 "Navarasa Baritham" + 2 songs Sivudu Sivudu Sivudu (1983)
 "Om Namah Shivaaya""Mounamana Neram" and "Baala Kanakamaya Chela Sagara Sangamam (1983)
 "Pilichina Muraliki" and "Koluvaitiva Ranga Saayi" Ananda Bhairavi (1984)
 "Mallepulu Gollumannavi" Anubandham (1984)
 "Induvadana", "Om Santhi", "Manase Mykam", "Bhama Ee Thippalu" and "Sayamkalam Sagarateeram" Challenge (1984)
 "Aakesi" Devanthakudu (1984)
 "Devathalara" and "Monnarathri" Hero (1984)
 "Tadisina Andaalalo" and "Ghallu Ghalluna" Janani Janma Bhoomi (1984)
 "O Priyatama Naa Gaganama" Kanchana Ganga (1984)
 "Modhalettana Pooja" Kathanayakudu (1984)
 "Gourisankara Sringam", "Idi Naa Priya Narthana" + 3 songs Mayuri (1984)
 "Breake Vesthe" Sahasame Jeevitham (1984)
 "Vennello Godari Andam","Kukukoo Kukukoo","Nee Gaanam" and "Jilibili Palukulu" Sitaara (1984)
 "Tholisaari Mimmalni", "Manasa Thullipadake" and "Lipileni Kanti Baasa" Srivariki Premalekha (1984)
 "Navvara Navvara" Tandava Krishnudu (1984)
 "Maduram Jeevana Sangeetham" + 4 songs Vasantha Geetham (1984)
 "Keeravani", "Ekantha Vela", "Edalo Laya" and "Ilalo" (1985)
 "Telusa Neeku Telusa" + 2 songs Babai Abbai (1985)
 "Andhama Ala" and "Idhi Pandhem" Donga (1985)
 "Evevo Kalalu Kannanu" + 2 songs Jwala (1985)
 "Gumma Gumma" and "Muddo Voo Vaddu" Maha Manishi (1985) 
 "Madhura Murali" + 3 songs Oka Radha Iddaru Krishnulu (1985)
 "Vennelaina Cheekataina" + 3 songs Pachani Kapuram (1985)
 "Venu Gana Loludiki"	+ 5 songs Pattabhishekam (1985)
 "Ee Chaitra Veena", "Gopemma Chethulo", "Nirantharamu"and "Vayyari Godaramma"	Preminchu Pelladu (1985)
 "O Maavayyo" and "Kanda Chusi Gunde Chusi" Puli (1985)
 "Hamma Hammamma Emito" Rakta Sindhuram (1985)
 "Aakasama Neevekkada"and "Edaya Mee Daya" Vande Mataram (1985)
 "Nee Meeda" and "6 o' Clock" Vijetha (1985)
 "Ee Dhuryodhana" Pratighatana (1985)
 "Swapna Priya Swapna" + 2 songs Apoorva Sahodarulu (1986)
 "Bugga Gilluko" Brahma Rudrulu (1986)
 "Bangaru Thotalo" & "Ramba Ramba" Kaliyuga Krishnudu (1986)
 "Ee Kourava Ee Dhanava" + 4 songs Kaliyuga Pandavulu (1986)
 "Sari Sari Nee Pani Sari" & "Sogasuga Mrudanga Talam"	Karu Diddina Kapuram (1986)
 "Sampenga Muddu", "Nee Pere Pranayama","Nee Moogaveenai Mogena","Akasam Bhumi Kalise" and "Oka Muddu Chalu" Kirathakudu (1986)
 "Angaanga Veeraangame" Kondaveeti Raja (1986)
 "Hayamma Hayamma" & "Porapatidhi" Ladies Tailor (1986)
 "Jatha kalise Iddaram" & "Mana Jeevithalu" Magadheerudu (1986)
 "Em Cheyanu" & "Idhigo Chettu Chaatuga" Muddula Krishnayya (1986)
 "Iruku Iruku Raikalo" Nippulanti Manishi (1986)
 "Aakasam Eenatidho"&"Yamuna Theere" Nirrekshana (1986)
 3 songs in Punyastree (1986)
 "Muddugare Yasoda"&"Ee Toorupu Aa Paschimam" Padamati Sandhya Ragam (1986)
 "Hey Naughty","Malli Malli","Acha Acha","Giliga Gili","Nee Meeda"and "Jaya Jaya" Rakshasudu (1986)
 "Kastandhuko","Viraha Veena" and"Johar Pellama" Rendu Rellu Aaru (1986)
 "Toli Poddullo" Srinivasa Kalyanam (1986)
 "Manasu Palike","Suvvi Suvvi"and "Chinnaari Ponnaari" Swathi Muthyam (1986)
 "Singari Eedu" Veta (1986)
 "Salami Dhigo" Vikram (1986)
 3 songs in Ajeyudu (1987)
 "Ashadam Vacchindhi" and "Banthi Pula Bavayya" Allari Krishnayya (1987)
 "Are Emaindhi" + 3 songs Aaradhana (1987)
 "Yerra Yerrani Bugga" and "Kamalam Kamalam" Agni Putrudu (1987)
 "Aadindhe Aata" and "Ammaa Abbaa" Bhale Mogudu (1987)
 "Kattukunna Mogude" and "Mallepoovu" Bhanumati Gari Mogudu (1987)
 "Anando Brahma" and "Vayyarama Nee Yavvaramemi" Bhargava Ramudu (1987)
 "Anando Brahma" and "Vannelaraani Kinnerasaani" Charkravarthy (1987)
 "O Chinuku" +2 songs Dharmapatni (1987)
 "Kokammaa Cheppammaa"and "Nee Kokakintha" Donga Mogudu (1987)
 "Tholisaari Thelisindi" and "Jebulu Kotte" Gandhinagar Rendo Veedhi (1987)
 "Hawa Hawai Choopokati" and ""Pora Kuyya" Jebu Donga (1987)
 "Kurise Megalu" + 2 songs Kirayi Dada (1987)
 "Emandii Illaalugaaruu" Lawyer Suhasini (1987)
 "Kondavagai Kodenagai" Madana Gopaludu (1987)
 "Sumam Pratisumam","Konalo"and "Matarani" Maharshi (1987)
 "Adagandhe Ammaina"and "Hey Hey Hero" Makutamleni Maharaju (1987)
 "Kashmiri Loyalo" + 2 songs Pasivadi Pranam (1987)
 "Sitrabngi Pilindi" President Gari Abbai (1987)
 "Vaanemi Chestundi" Ramu (1987)
 "Orori Sureeda"and"Suvvi Gopalude" Sahasa Samrat (1987)
 "Toli Poddullo" Srinivasa Kalyanam (1987)
 "Mera Jootha Hai Japani" and "Sri Saaradaamba" Sruthilayalu (1987)
 "Paaraahushaar","Sinnii Sinnii Korikaladagaa","Hello Hello Darling","Siggoo Poobanti"and"Kaamudu Kaamudu" Swayam Krushi (1987)
 "Mangchaav Mangchaav"and"Bye Bye Bye" Trimurthulu (1987)
 "Look At Me" Vijetha Vikram (1987)
 "Swathi Chinuku" Akhari Poratam (1988)
 "Manchu Kurise""Chukkalanti""Rangulalo Kalavo" (1988)
 "Adenu Oka Puvvalle" Asthulu Anthasthulu (1988)
 "Naa Villu Harivillu" Bava Marudula Saval (1988)
 "Chakkiligili Chikkulamudi"and"Kotta Pellikutura"Bazaar Rowdy (1988)
 3 Songs in Bharatamlo Bala Chandrudu (1988)
 2 Songs in Brahma Puthrudu (1988)
 4 Songs in Chikkadu Dorakadu (1988)
 2 Songs in Chinababu (1988)
 3 Songs in Chuttalabbayi (1988)
 2 Songs in Donga Pelli (1988)
 "Asale Kasi Kasi" Donga Ramudu (1988)
 "Alaa Choodaboku" Inspector Pratap (1988)
 "Lagi Jigi" and "Edi Swathi Jallu" Jamadagni (1988)
 "Ni Charanam Kamalam" Janaki Ramudu (1988)
 "Samsara Jeevitham" , "Muddoche Bulbul Pita"and "O Vayyari" Jeevana Jyothi (1988)
 "Repo Mapo Pellanta" Jhansi Rani (1988)
 "Guvva Gorinka Tho""Righto Atto Ito""Atu Amalapuram"	"Chali Gali Kottindamma" Khaidi No.786 (1988)
 3 songs in Mugguru Kodukulu (1988)
 "Premante Mosamani" Murali Krishnudu (1988)
 2 songs in Prana Snehithulu (1988)
 5 songs in Ramudu Bheemudu (1988)
 "Sa Sa Saragaladali" and "Madhura Madhura Meevela" Rao Gari Illu (1988)
 4 Songs in Rowdy No.1 (1988)
 4 Songs in Sahasam Cheyara Dimbaka (1988)
 "Eynadu""Nuvvuna""Telisindile""Mallika Pogadaku""Siggestonda"and "Vennelai Padana" Sri Kanakamahalakshmi Recording Dance Troupe (1988)
 "Kothaga Rekkalochena"and"Aathmathvam" Swarnakamalam (1988)
 4 Songs in Thodallullu (1988)
 "Pedda Pedda Kalla" Tiragabadda Telegubidda (1988)
 "Lovely Lakumuki""Natukottudu"and"Chempala Kempula" Trinetrudu (1988)
 "Seetarama Swamy" Vivaha Bhojanambu (1988)
 "Vanajallu Gillutunte"and "Pillatoti" Yamudiki Mogudu (1988)
 5 Songs in Agni (1989)
 "Endaro Mahanubhavulu"and"Jhanak Jhanak" Ashoka Chakravarthy (1989)
 4 songs in Attaku Yamudu Ammayiki Mogudu (1989)
 3 songs in Bala Gopaludu (1989)
 5 songs in Bhale Donga (1989)
 2 songs in Dharma Teja (1989)
 4 songs in Dhruva Nakshatram (1989)
 1 songs in Gaduggayi (1989)
 "Om Namaha" Geethanjali (1989)
 4 songs in Goonda Rajyam (1989)
 "Achulu Padaharu" "Idi Saragamlerugani Raagamu" Hai Hai Nayaka (1989)
 "Sandhya Ragapu Sarigamalo" and "Dora Dora Donga Muddu" Indrudu Chandrudu (1989)
 2 songs in Koduku Diddina Kapuram (1989)
 "Jivvumani Kondagali", "Padaharella Vayasu" + 2 songs in Lankeswarudu (1989)
 "Ye Bapu Neerpinidi" + 4 songs in Mouna Poratam (1989)
 2 songs in Muddula Mavayya (1989)
 "Premalekha Raasa"and "Ichcohuko" Muthyamantha Muddu (1989)
 2 songs in Ontari Poratam (1989)
 "Sarasalu" in Siva (1989)
 3 songs in Swathi Chinukulu
 "One Two Three" + 2 songs in Two Town Rowdy (1989)
 4 songs in Vicky Daada (1989)
 2 songs in Vijay (1989)
 5 songs in Ayudham (1990)
 5 songs from Aggi Ramudu (1990)
 "Idi Cheragani Prema" & "Goranta Deepam" Ankusam (1990)
 "Prematho" Bamma Maata Bangaru Baata (1990)
 "Ayyo Ayyo" "Kanya Kumari" and "Odante Vinade"  Bobbili Raja (1990)
 2 songs from Chaitanya (1990)
"Yamaho Nee""Priyatama" and "Andalalo"  Jagadeka Veerudu Athiloka Sundari (1990)
"Kola Kolamma""Tip Top""Sri Anjaneyam"and "Devi Sambavi" Kondaveeti Dongs (1990)
 "Baalayya Baalayya" and "Dasara Vachindayya" Lorry Driver (1990)
 "Osi Manasa Neeku Thelusa" and "Kondallo Bada O Konallo" Neti Siddhardha (1990)
 4 songs from Prananiki Pranam (1990)
 "Swathi Muthyapu" + 5 songs in Prema Yuddham (1990)
 "Ellelo" in Raja Vikramarka (1990)
 3 songs in Rao Garintlo Rowdy (1990)
 "Raasaleela Vela"	"Centurilu Kottey Vayassu" and "Suramodamu"  Aditya 369 (1991)
 "Hello Guru" "Mila Mila" and "Epudepudepudani" Nirnayam (1991)
 7 songs in Shanti Kranthi (1991)
 1 song in Stuartpuram Police Station (1991)
 "Jijinaka Jinkara" in Surya IPS (1991)
 "Pavuramaa Pavuramaa" + 3 songs in Aa Okkati Adakku (1991)
 3 songs from Asadhyulu (1992)
 3 songs from Aswamedham (1992)
 "Madhurame Sudha Ganam""Oho Oho Bujji Pavurama""Aa Roju Naa Rani" and "Abbo Emi Vinta" Brundavanam (1992)
 "Bullipitta" in Chinarayudu (1992)
 "Muddhuto Shrungara Beetu" "Are Inka Janka" and "Pelliki Munde Okka Sari"Dharma Kshetram (1992)
 3 songs from Killer (1992)
 2 songs from Raguluthnna Bharatham (1992)
 "Kotha Pittaro Kokko" Detective Narada (1993)
 5 songs from Tholi Muddhu (1993)
 "Narudaa O Narudaa" and "Ambaa Shambavi" Bhairava Dweepam (1994)
 "Rajashekara" in Mugguru Monagallu (1994)
 "Bandenaka Bandi" in Palnati Pourusham (1994)
 "Pakka Gentleman Ni" in Super Police (1994)
 3 songs from Sri Krishnarjuna Vijayam (1996)
 "Ramudu Mechina Udatha" in Mama Bagunnava (1997)
 "Pullalla Mantivi" in Osey Ramulamma (1997)
 "Suridu Poova" in Anthahpuram (1998)
 5 songs from Pape Naa Pranam (1998)
 "Okkari Kosam" in Kshemanga Velli Labhanga Randi (2000) 
 "Maha Kanaka Durga" in Devullu (2000)
 "Amma Ane Pilichi" in Simharasi (2001)

Hindi films 
Composer Bappi Lahiri was impressed by a Hindi song sung by S Janaki for a Tamil movie, when he visited Prasad Studio. He decided to have songs sung by her in his upcoming Hindi movies and introduced her to Bollywood. She sang many duets with singer Kishore Kumar.

Some of her notable Hindi songs are
 "Prabhu more awgun chit na dharo" Sur Sangam (1985)
 "Ayo prabhat sab mil gaayo" Sur Sangam (1985)
 "Yaar Bina Chain Kahan Re" Saaheb (1985)
 "Aayaa jab se tu dil mein" Jhoothi (1985)
 "Jawan Hai Dil Jawan Hain Hum" Saaheb (1985)
 "Sun Rubia Tumse Pyar Ho Gaya" Mard (1985)
 "Mamla Gadbad Hai" Dharm Adhikari (1986)
 "Aankhen do" Dharm Adhikari (1986)
 "Tune mera doodh piya" Aakhree Raasta (1986)
 "Pag Paadam" Naache Mayuri(1986)
 "Dil mein ho tum" Satyamev Jayate (1987)
 "Main tere liye" Main Tere Liye (1989)
 "Poocho Na Kysa Maza" Awwal Number (1990)

Odia films 
Janaki sang many evergreen songs in Odia. She has sung about 68 songs in Odia films. Her songs are still popular today and she also won 1 Orissa State Film Award.

Other languages 

Janaki also sang a few songs in other languages.
 One Japanese song in Adutha Veettu Penn (1960)
 One German song in Puthu Paatu (1990)
 One English song in Swayamkrushi (1986)
 One French song ( uncredited )
 One Sinhalese song in Sihinaya(Mal Peedi Prema Wrukshaye)(1959).

Collaboration with Music Directors 

Janaki has worked with music directors of different generations. From the early 1960s she was given songs by composers mainly in Kannada and Malayalam films.Though she sang fewer songs in Telugu and Tamil during the beginning of her career she went on to rule the playback industry across all four south Indian languages from mid 1970s.

G. K. Venkatesh 
G. K. Venkatesh was one of the early composers who brought a renaissance in Kannada film music.
He started composing for more films from early 1960s and went on to give some remarkable songs to Janaki. GKV-SJ-PBS combination was the talk of the town those days.
Two songs which need special mention from this combination are "nambide ninna naadhadevate" from Sandhya Raga and "Karedaru kelade" from Sanaadi Appanna: both became very popular.
Dr. Rajkumar, who had begun his acting career in 1950s, got to sing his first duet with S. Janaki – "Tumbitu Manavaa" – for the film "Mahishasura Mardini" in which he played the villain.

M. Ranga Rao 
M. Ranga Rao was one of the composers who contributed memorable songs to Kannada film music.
He collaborated with S. Janaki for many films, including Edakallu Guddada Mele ("Sanyasi Sanyasi") directed by Puttanna Kanagal. Ranga Rao composed memorable duets sung by Dr. Rajkumar and S. Janaki for "Vasanta Geeta", "Hosabelaku" and "Samayada Gombe".

For Hosabelaku, Ranga Rao composed a melodious tune for a poem by Rashtrakavi Kuvempu "Teredide Mane O Baa Atithi" and S. Janaki sung this along with another legendary singer Vani Jayaram.

M. S. Baburaj 
The earliest recognised collaboration of S Janaki's was with the Malayalam composer MS Baburaj, who specialised in Hindustani music. Under his direction, Janaki was able to give voice to some of Kerala's best loved film songs of all time during the 1960s and early 1970s. The songs they've worked on have been known for their outward expressions, both in voice and the composition by itself. Some of Janaki's best known solos come from this collaboration, including Vasantha Panchami Naalil (Bhargavi Nilayam), Anjana Kannezhuthi (Thacholi Othenan), and Thaane Thirinjum Marinjum (Ambalapravu).

Ilaiyaraaja 
Ilaiyaraaja knew about Janaki's vocal range and versatility when he worked with G. K. Venkatesh. When he got a chance to compose music for his debut film Annakkili (1976) he made Janaki sing 3 songs which became immensely popular thus beginning an era in Tamil cinema. This combination churned out hits after hits pushing S Janaki to the numero uno position for at least the next 2 decades. S Janaki won 4 state awards in Tamil in his compositions. He explored her voice in wide variety of songs and she became the first choice for songs with village background.

She sang maximum duets with Balasubrahmanyam, Malaysia Vasudevan, Mano, Yesudas, Jayachandran. Ilayaraaja himself sang around 200 duets with Janaki; most were chart busters. After Ilaiyaraaja started giving more songs to S. Janaki, even other music composers followed by making her sing their top hits.

SPB-IR-SJ created some of the finest duets of Tamil cinemas. 1980s saw the meteoric rise of Janaki with a strong back up from Ilayaraja, as she sang his songs in all four South Indian languages.

Rajan–Nagendra 
Rajan and Nagendra have a unique place in the hearts of Kannada music lovers. S Janaki was a part of almost all their albums. During the initial days, RN gave many duets to PBS-SJ. Later their main singers were SPB and S Janaki.  Almost all of their songs remain etched as the unforgettable melodies of Kannada Cinema. The romantic duets that came out from the SPB-S Janaki-Rajan–Nagendra combination are considered to be heavenly and evergreen. Radios called the pair of SPB and S Janaki as "Love Birds" and are termed to be the "Best singing pair" in Kannada cinema, owing mainly to their romantic duets composed by Rajan–Nagendra in the 1970s and 80s In terms of numbers, it was Rajan–Nagendra who gave maximum songs to Janaki after Ilaiyaraaja.
The solos and duets that S Janaki rendered under these music composers can never be erased from the minds of the Kannada audience. Some top hit songs came from movies such as Eradu Kanasu, Hombisilu,  Gaali Maathu, Pavana Ganga, Avala Hejje, Chandana Gombe,  Naa Ninna Bidalare and the list continues.

Hamsalekha 
By the end of 80s Hamsalekha established himself as the top music composer in Kannada cinema pushing all the veteran composers to the background. His strong association with actor Ravichandran resulted in so many hit songs. S Janaki was his first choice during the initial days of his career. SPB-SJ-HL created some of the evergreen duets in movies like Premaloka and Ranadheera. S Janaki worked in more than 40 films with Hamsalekha and sang all-time hit solos and duets.

Vijaya Bhaskar 
Kannada cinema offered SJ real gems of her singing career and Vijaya Bhaskar is no exception. Though his main singers were P Susheela in 60s and Vani Jayaram and Chitra in 70s and 80s, he gave some of his best compositions to S Janaki in movies like Gejje Pooje, Bellimoda, Upasane, Seetha (1970 film); he chose her whenever the song needed some special singing. "Gaganavu ello bhoomiyu ello" remains one of the most memorable songs of S Janaki. If we take the top 10 songs of S Janaki in Kannada cinema there would definitely be at least 2 songs composed by Bhaskar.

A. R. Rahman 
During the '90s, Janaki sang many great Tamil songs for A. R. Rahman at the early stage of his career. Songs like "Ottagatha Kattiko", "Gopala Gopala", "Nenjinele", "Kadhal Kaditham Theetave", "Mudhalvane", "Kathirika", "Endhan Nenjil", "Margazhi Thinkal" and many are still popular. She won the Tamil Nadu State Film Award for Best Female Playback for "Margazhi Thinkal Allava" from the film Sangamam under his composition.

Legacy and popularity 
Janaki and voice modulation is synonymous. She has done a wide range of voice modulation according to the age of the character in all four South Indian languages. She is perhaps the only singer who won state awards for the same. Tamil Nadu state award for "Poda poda pokka" song from Uthiripookkal (1978) and Andhra Pradesh State award for "Govullu tellana" song from Saptapadi (1981 film). Songs she sang in kids-voice in 70s in Kannada too were popular, one such song is "Thayiya thandeya" from the film Madhura Sangama(1978). She sang many such songs for 3 year old, young boy, goatish voice, male voice and voice of aged woman. She sung more than 48000+ songs across all languages.

Toughest song 
Janaki says that the toughest song of her singing career is the fastest swaras Kannada song "Shiva shiva ennada naaligeyeke" from the movie Hemavathi (film). The song, which is in two different ragas, Thodi and Aabhogi, was composed by L. Vaidyanathan.

Awards & honours 

National Film Awards
Best Female Playback Singer

 1977 – (Song: "Senthoora Poove") 16 Vayathinile, Tamil Film
 1981 – (Song: "Ettumanoorambalathil") Oppol, Malayalam Film
 1984 – (Song: "Vennello godari andham") Sitaara, Telugu Film
 1992 – (Song: "Inji Iduppazhagha") Devar Magan, Tamil Film

Mirchi Music Awards
 2015 – Lifetime achievement award – South 

Filmfare Awards South
Filmfare Lifetime Achievement Award – South – 1997

Kerala State Film Awards
Best Female Playback Singer
 1970 – Sthree
 1972 – Pulliman
 1974 – Chandrakantham
 1976 –   Aalinganam
 1977 –   Madanolsavam
 1979 –   Thakara
 1980 –   Manjil Virinja Pookkal,Chamaram, Aniyatha Valakal
 1981 –   Various films
 1982 –   Various films
 1983 –   Various film
 1984 –   Kanamarayathu

Nandi Awards (Andhra Pradesh State Film, Music, Television and Arts Awards)
Best Female Playback Singer
 1980 –   Sri Vasavi Kanyaka Parameswari Mahatyam
 1981 –   Sapthapadhi
 1983 –   Sagara Sangamam
 1985 –   Pratighatana
 1986 –   Aruna Kiranam
 1988 –   Janaki Ramudu
 1994 –   Bhairava Dweepam
 1997 –   Thodu
 1998 –   Anthapuram
 2000 –   Sri Sai Mahima

Tamil Nadu State Film Awards
Best Female Playback Singer
 1970 –   Namma Kuzhanthaigal
 1977 –   16 Vayathinile
 1979 –   Uthiripookkal
 1981 –   Moondram Pirai
 1982 –   Kaadhal Oviyam
 1999 –   Sangamam

Orissa State Film Awards
 1986 – Best Female Playback Singer – Sata Kebe Luchi Rahena

Filmfare Awards
 1986: Filmfare Award for Best Female Playback Singer – Nomination – "Yaar Bina Chain Kahan Re (Saaheb)

Special Honours
 1986 – Kalaimamani from the Government of Tamil Nadu
 1987 – Sursinger Award for Mayuri (Hindi Version)
 1992 – Paavender Bharathidasan Award (Tamil Nadu State Film Honorary Award)
 1997 – Filmfare Lifetime Achievement Award – South
 2002 – Cinema 'Achiever Award' from the Government of Kerala
 2001 – Special Jury Swaralaya Yesudas Award for outstanding performance in music
 2006 – Favourite Female Playback Singer Vijay Awards
 2009 – Honorary doctorate from the University of Mysore for contributions to Kannada Cinema
 2011 – "Basava Bhushan" Award from Karnataka
 2012 – Evergreen Voice of Indian Cinema Vijay Music Awards
 2013 – Maa Music Life Time achievement award by Maa Music Awards
 2013 – Padma Bhushan Award from Government of India (She refused to accept it citing too late and too little)
 2013 – Lifetime Achievement Award from Udaya Film Awards
 2014 – Karnataka Rajyotsava award, the second highest civilian award of the Karnataka state, by the Government of Karnataka in 2014
 2014 – Dr. Rajkumar Lifetime Achievement Award for the contribution to the Kannada Cinema
 2015 – Life Time Achievement Award from Radio Mirchi for Outstanding Contribution in all South Indian Languages [Kannada, Malayalam, Tamil and Telugu]
 2016 – SIIMA Lifetime Achievement Award for Outstanding Contribution in all South Indian Languages
2018 – Santosham Lifetime Achievement Award at 16th Santosham Film Awards.
 2018 June 5 – SPB National Award by S. P. Balasubrahmanyam.
 2019– First Recipient of the MS Subbulakshmi National Award for immense contribution to the field of music, Tamil Nadu State Government

Other Awards
 First Recipient of M S Baburaj Award
 First Recipient of P. Susheela trust National Award
First Recipient of V Dakshinamoorthi Award
 Madhavapeddi Sathyam Award
 Vayalar Award for contribution to Malayalam Film Music
 Geeta Dutt Award from Andhra Pradesh Government
 Chi Udayashankar Award
 Sangeetha Ganga Gayana Award
 Sangeetha Rathna by Sangeetha Kalavedika
 Singer of the Century Award
 Manna Dey Puraskaar in 2014
 Singer Jikki Award in 2014
 First Recipient of Ramu Karyat Foundation Award
 Gulf Malayalam Musical Award

References 

include{studio.h}

External links 
 Selected Songs of S Janaki
 

Living people
1938 births
Telugu playback singers
Singers from Andhra Pradesh
Indian women classical singers
Indian women playback singers
Tamil playback singers
Kannada playback singers
Kerala State Film Award winners
Malayalam playback singers
Tamil Nadu State Film Awards winners
Nandi Award winners
Filmfare Awards South winners
People from Guntur district
Film musicians from Andhra Pradesh
20th-century Indian women musicians
21st-century Indian women musicians
20th-century Indian singers
21st-century Indian singers
20th-century Indian composers
21st-century Indian composers
Indian women composers
Women musicians from Andhra Pradesh
20th-century Indian women singers
21st-century Indian women singers
Best Female Playback Singer National Film Award winners
Recipients of the Rajyotsava Award 2014
20th-century women composers
21st-century women composers
Santosham Film Awards winners
Sanskrit-language singers
South Indian International Movie Awards winners